Marko Mijović (born October 5, 1987) is a Montenegrin professional basketball player for Mornar Bar of the Montenegrin League.

External links
 at Eurobasket.com
 at FIBA.com 
 at aba-liga.com
 at BGBasket.com

References

1987 births
Living people
ABA League players
KK Mornar Bar players
KK Radnički Obrenovac players
KK Teodo Tivat players
MBK Handlová players
Montenegrin expatriate basketball people in Serbia
Montenegrin men's basketball players
People from Bar, Montenegro
Point guards